Badri Nath Prasad (1899-1966) was an Indian parliamentarian. He wrote many books on mathematics and was awarded the Padma Bhushan in 1963. He was a nominated member of the Rajya Sabha from 1964 till his death in 1966.

References

Sources
Brief Biodata

Nominated members of the Rajya Sabha
1899 births
1966 deaths
Recipients of the Padma Bhushan in literature & education